was a Japanese right-wing ultranationalist youth who attempted to assassinate Japanese journalist and magazine publisher Hōji Shimanaka in February 1961, in what became known as the Shimanaka Incident. Komori sought retribution for a fictional story published in one of Shimanaka's magazines which featured a dream sequence in which the Emperor and Empress were beheaded by a guillotine. Shimanaka was away from home at the time of Komori's assault, and he ended up stabbing Shimanaka's wife and murdering his housemaid. Komori was 17 years old at the time of his attack.

Early life

Komori was born in Nagazaki, Japan, on May 25, 1943. His mother, Tatsu, committed suicide when he was a young boy. His neighbors later described him as having been a "moody" child, and in high school he was once admitted to a mental hospital following a nervous breakdown. After graduating from high school, he drifted around the country taking on various odd jobs. On January 3, 1961, he joined prominent ultra-rightist Bin Akao's Greater Japan Patriotic Party, and withdrew from the party just hours before his attack on Shimanaka's household.

Attack

On February 1, 1961, at the age of 17, Komori went to the home of prominent Tokyo publisher Hōji Shimanaka with the intent to kill him in retribution for a fiction story by Shichirō Fukazawa printed in Shimanaka's magazine Chūō Kōron that described the overthrow and murder of the Japanese Imperial family. The story, which satirized the recent Anpo protests, depicted a dream sequence in which the reigning emperor and empress were beheaded, along with the crown prince and princess. Shimanaka was not at home but Komori murdered his 51-year-old maid and critically injured the publisher's wife. Komori initially fled the scene, but later turned himself in to police.

Aftermath

Komori was tried as an adult and sentenced to 15 years in prison. This murder and the assassination of Inejiro Asanuma by Otoya Yamaguchi led to the arrest of Bin Akao in 1961. Komori died in prison in 1971.

References

External links 

 嶋中事件 
 主張412 : 早稲田大学新聞会 

1943 births
1971 deaths
People from Tokyo
Japanese anti-communists
Japanese people convicted of murder
Minors convicted of murder
Japanese people who died in prison custody
Prisoners who died in Japanese detention
People convicted of murder by Japan
1961 murders in Japan